A Man Who Was Superman is a 2008 South Korean film directed by Jeong Yoon-chul. The film applies techniques of magical realism to problems arising from the Narcissism of small differences that plagues the modern Korean conscience.

Plot 
Song Soo-jung is a producer going on her third year at a small company. Her speciality is filming human interest stories. She is driven to produce these shallow stories for the sake of her ambition of one day becoming Korea's own Oprah Winfrey. However, she is reaching the end of what's left of her pride. After months of not getting paid, one day she leaves her office as usual with the company camera to produce a story on a lion apparently refusing to eat its meal. On her way, however, she comes across a robber, but she is saved somehow by "Superman" in a Hawaiian shirt. Superman claims he's unable to tap into his superhuman powers because "bad guys" have placed kryptonite inside his head. However, he doesn't let that get in his way of helping others, and saving the world from global warming and rescuing a lost puppy. Soo-jung can see this will make a good story and, with a little tweaking and a little fabricating, she produces the "Superman Saves the World" documentary which goes on to be a ratings hit. After an X-Ray examination of "Superman's" skull, it becomes clear that there really is something stuck in his head - a bullet.
However, the true story behind this Superman (whose real name is Lee Hyuk-Suk), is revealed: two major tragedies that befell Hyun-Suk traumatized him and left him believing he was, in fact, Superman. When Lee was a boy, he saw Superman with his father, who told him that if he counted to one-hundred, he would become Superman. Caught in a skirmish during the Gwangju Democratization Movement, Lee's father is killed, and the young Lee is shot in the back of the head. Miraculously, he lived with the bullet still lodged in his skull. Years later Lee, his wife, and daughter were hit in a car accident. His wife died instantly, but his daughter survived. In the burning wreckage, Lee told his daughter if she counted to one hundred, he'd turn into Superman to save her. Unfortunately, just as he was running to the car with a fire extinguisher, the bullet in his head caused a seizure, causing him to collapse on the road. As he writhed on the ground in pain, the car exploded with his daughter still inside. None of the onlookers in the crowd attempted to help Lee or his daughter. It was at this moment when mental trauma caused Lee to believe he was Superman. 
Lee lives his life with the belief that he is indeed Superman. Soo-jung follows Lee around as he attempts to help the community in his bizarre fashion. With his "super-deeds" Lee inspires hope within the community and people begin to follow his example. But this change Lee inspired only manifests when he has lost all hope in attempting to rescue a police officer from underneath a burning car. It's at this moment that people help Lee in trying to rescue the police officer. But when Lee attempts to save a child from a burning building, he ends up going in alone. In the collapsing building Lee couldn't find any way to escape, so he ends up jumping out of a window with the child, landing on his head. From there he flies and goes back in time to save himself from the bullet that hits Lee in his childhood. He returns to the present (Sadly, it was all a dream...) where in actuality he died landing on his head saving the child. No one in the crowd helped as they just looked on. In the hospital there appeared to be an "S" when they were about to take his organ.  Soo-jung is inspired by Lee's sacrifice and follows his example by helping an old woman. From then on Soo-jung remembers a phrase used by Lee Hyun-Suk when they first met - "Strength doesn't open big iron doors but a small key." This helps the frosty, calculating Soo-jung to awaken to what's truly important in life.

Cast 
 Hwang Jung-min as Lee Hyun-suk
 Jun Ji-hyun Song Soo-jung
 Jeon Su-ji as Parking lot woman

Release 
A Man Who Was Superman was released in South Korea on 31 January 2008, and on its opening weekend was ranked fourth at the box office with 206,858 admissions. As of 31 March 2008 it had received a total of 559,867 admissions, and as of 17 February 2008 had grossed at total of $3,848,034.

References

External links 
 
 
 

2008 films
2008 comedy-drama films
South Korean comedy-drama films
CJ Entertainment films
Films about television
Films shot in Seoul
Films directed by Jeong Yoon-cheol
2000s Korean-language films
2008 comedy films
2008 drama films
2000s South Korean films